Bhikhi may refer to:

 Bhikhi, Pakistan, a Union Council of Mandi Bahauddin District.
 Bhikhi, India, a nagar panchayat of Mansa district.